The Canadian International Stakes is a Grade I stakes race for thoroughbred racehorses three years of age and up on Turf. It is held annually in October at Woodbine Racetrack in Toronto, Ontario, Canada.

Since its creation in 1938, the race has undergone many changes including the conditions, track surface, distance, location, and name. The first renewal was run as the Long Branch Championship, held at the Long Branch Racetrack in Etobicoke. and was restricted to Canadian-bred three-year-olds. In 1939, it was renamed the Canadian International Stakes and was restricted to Canadian-owned horses. In 1940, the race was opened to horses of all ages, though the owner still had to be a Canadian resident. In 1954, the eligibility was revised to ages three and up with no residence restriction. The race name was modified slightly from 1966 to 1980 when it was known as the Canadian International Championship Stakes. From 1981 through to 1995 the race was known as the Rothmans International for its sponsor, the Canadian subsidiary of Rothmans International plc. Later the race was sponsored by Pattison Outdoor Advertising.

Inaugurated in 1938 on the dirt at Toronto's Long Branch Racetrack, except for consolidation during World War II it remained there until 1956 when the track closed its doors. Moved to Woodbine Racetrack in 1956, in 1958 it became a turf race.

On dirt:
 1938–1941 :  miles at Long Branch Racetrack
 1942–1945 :  miles at Dufferin Racetrack
 1946–1952 :  miles at Long Branch Racetrack
 1953–1954 :  miles at Long Branch Racetrack
 1955  miles at Long Branch Racetrack
 1956–1957 :   miles at Woodbine Racetrack

On turf at Woodbine Racetrack:
 1958–1986  miles
 1987–1993  miles (Out of Chute, inside of main track)
 1994–2021  miles (One full circuit, outside of main track)
 2023–present  miles

Since 1958, winners have come from breeding farms in Canada, the United States, Ireland, the United Kingdom, France and Argentina. The Canadian International has been contested by many of the greatest horses, jockeys, and trainers in thoroughbred racing history from around the world. Its success as a North American race drawing an international field helped inspire the creation of the Breeders' Cup races in 1984 which were held at Woodbine in 1996.

The Canadian International has been won by many notable horses. The most renowned renewal was in 1973 when the Canadian International was the final race for Secretariat. His  lengths victory is the widest winning margin in the race's history. Other famous winners include Bunty Lawless, voted "Canadian Horse of the Half Century", who won in 1938 and 1941. In 1974, Dahlia was the first European-based horse to win the race, becoming the first horse to win Group / Grade One stakes in England, France, Ireland, Canada and the U.S.

Since Eclipse Award voting began in 1971, eight winners of the International were named Champion turf horse for that year: Secretariat (1973), Dahlia (1974), Snow Knight (1975), Youth (1976), Mac Diarmida (1978), All Along (1983), Singspiel (1996) and Chief Bearhart (1997).

In 2005, the purse for the race was increased to $2 million to help attract European horses who did not choose to enter the Breeders' Cup Turf. The purse was reduced to $1.5 million in 2011, then to $1 million in 2013 and to $800,000 in 2017.

The Canadian International was not run in 2020 due to the COVID-19 Pandemic. The 2022 race was also scrapped due to COVID-related logistical issues that made it difficult for overseas horses to travel to Canada at the time.

Records
Time record: (Turf)
  miles: 2:40.00 – Dahlia (1974)
  miles: 2:25.60 – Raintrap (1994)

Most wins:
 3 – Joshua Tree (2010, 2012, 2013)
 2 – Bunty Lawless (1938, 1941)
 2 – Shepperton (1942, 1943)
 2 – George Royal (1965, 1966)
 2 – Majesty's Prince (1982, 1984)
 2 – Desert Encounter (2018, 2019)

Most wins by an owner:
 4 – E. P. Taylor / Windfields Farm (1950, 1951, 1953, 1975)
 3 – Nelson Bunker Hunt (1974, 1976, 1977)

Most wins by a jockey:
 4 – Frankie Dettori (2000, 2004, 2012, 2021)
 3 – Bobby Watson (1942, 1943, 1944)
 3 – Ryan Moore (2013, 2014, 2015)

Most wins by a trainer:
 3 – Gordon J. McCann (1941, 1951, 1953)
 3 – Horatio Luro (1956, 1957, 1971)
 3 – Maurice Zilber (1974, 1976, 1977)
 3 – Michael Stoute (1996, 2014, 2015)

Winners

 In 1969 Tradesman won but was disqualified and placed last.
 In 1992 Wiorno finished first but was disqualified and placed third.

See also
 List of Canadian flat horse races

References

External links
 Ten Things You Should Know about the Canadian International at Hello Race Fans!

Grade 1 stakes races in Canada
Open middle distance horse races
Turf races in Canada
Woodbine Racetrack
Recurring sporting events established in 1938
1938 establishments in Ontario
Horse races in Ontario